Neyngi Yaaru Vakivee is a 2016 Maldivian romantic film directed by Hussain Munawwar. Produced under the banner Kid Production, the film stars Aminath Rishfa and Ahmed Azmeel in pivotal roles. The film also stars Ahmed Nimal, Ismail Jumaih and Maleeha Waheed in supporting roles. The film was shot at different locations in Sri Lanka.

Cast 
 Ahmed Azmeel as Kamal
 Aminath Rishfa as Reema
 Ismail Jumaih as Sham
 Maleeha Waheed as Laila
 Ahmed Nimal as Abdul Zaki

Soundtrack 
The musical score was composed by Hassan Jalaal.

Release and reception 
Neyngi Yaaru Vakivee was released on 4 March 2016 and opened to a positive response at the box office and did average business at the end of its run.

The film received a mixed to negative response from critics. Ahmed Nadheem from Avas criticised the overall film, labeling it "boring" and mentioned the screenplay by Ibrahim Nifar as the weakest factor in the film. He noted that there is no aspect in the film that the audience would find exciting. Ahmed Jaishan of Vaguthu gave the film 3.5 out of 5 stars, and praised Jumaih's acting along with Rishfa's. However he criticised the acting of Maleeha Waheedh, further mentioning the weak screenplay lacked fine character development.

Accolades

References

2016 films
Films shot in Sri Lanka
2016 romantic drama films
Maldivian romantic drama films